George Allen Field is a 1,000 seat soccer stadium on the campus of California State University, Long Beach in Long Beach, California. It is named after Los Angeles Rams and Washington Redskins head coach George Allen.

Tenants and history
It is currently the home of the Long Beach State 49ers women's soccer team.  The stadium was named after George Allen, a Pro Football Hall of Fame inductee who coached the Long Beach State football program for one season shortly before his death.

Push for a new stadium
Despite the relative success of the women's soccer program, the program was still confined to George Allen Field.  Men's volleyball head coach, Alan Knipe, had previously been in a similar situation with men's volleyball.  Upon the completion of the Walter Pyramid, his program saw a sharp increase in recruiting and interest from prospects.  This is the same situation that the women's soccer program was mired in and Knipe summed up the state of the field:

In early 2009, the Beach Legacy Referendum, which in part was due to give Long Beach State a new 3,000 to 5,000 seat stadium, was defeated by the students with a vote of 3,912–2,615.

Other uses
George Allen Field was used in the movie American Wedding, from the American Pie film series.

References

External links
 Long Beach State athletic facilities

Sports venues in Long Beach, California
College soccer venues in the United States